Fingerprints & Footprints: The Ultimate Collection is a double greatest hits album by Australian alternative rock band Powderfinger, released on 5 November 2011 in Australia.
The album contains two greatest hits albums, the previously released Fingerprints: The Best of Powderfinger, 1994–2000 and the then-new Footprints: The Best of Powderfinger, 2001-2011

Track listing

Charts

Weekly charts

Year-end charts

References

Powderfinger albums
2011 greatest hits albums
Compilation albums by Australian artists